Cuando Cubango (Umbundu: Kwando Kubango Volupale) is a province of Angola and it has an area of 199,049km2 and a population of 534,002 in 2014. Menongue is the capital of the province. The governor of the province is José Martins, who was appointed governor in November 2021.

The name of the province derives from that of the Cuando and Cubango rivers, which flow through the eastern and western edges of the province, respectively.

History 

Throughout much of the 1980s and 1990s, Cuando Cubango served as the location for the primary base camp of Angola's UNITA rebel movement, led by Jonas Savimbi. The rebel movement received support from the United States as part of the Cold War conflict against Angola's Marxist government, which was supported by the Soviet Union, Cuba and other communist states.

Savimbi and UNITA maintained a large and clandestine base camp in the Cubando Cubango town of Jamba. The camp was protected by anti-aircraft weapons and included an air strip, which was used for the delivery of military and other supplies, which typically arrived from neighboring Zaire. The Angolan Civil War ultimately became one of the most prominent conflicts of the Cold War, with both the United States and the Soviet Union depicting its outcome as important to the global balance of power.

Geography
Cuando Cubango is traversed by the northwesterly line of equal latitude and longitude. It is located in the extreme south-east of Angola. To the north and north-east it is bordered with Moxico Province, and in the west - the provinces of Huila and Cunene. In the south of Cuando Cubango it borders Namibia, and to the east - Zambia.

Municipalities
The province of Cuando Cubango contains nine municipalities:

 Calai
 Cuangar
 Cuchi
 Cuito Cuanavale
 Dirico
 Mavinga
 Menongue
 Nancova
 Rivungo

Communes
The province of Cuando Cubango contains the following communes; sorted by their respective municipalities:

 Calai Municipality – Calai, Maué, Mavengue
 Cuangar Municipality – Caila (Bondo), Cuangar, Savate
 Cuchi Municipality – Chinguanja, Cuchi, Cutato (Kutato), Vissati
 Cuito Cuanavale Municipality – Baixo Longa, Cuito Cuanavale, Longa, Lupire (Lupiri)
 Dirico Municipality – Dirico, Mucusso, Xamavera
 Mavinga Municipality – Cunjamba Dima, Cutuile (Kutuile), Luengue, Mavinga
 Menongue Municipality – Caiundo (Kaiundo), Cueio-Betre, Menongue, Missombo
 Nancova Municipality – Nancova, Rito
 Rivungo Municipality – Chipundo, Jamba-Cueio, Luiana, Mainha Neriquinha, Rivungo

Natural history 
Considerable natural habitat previously existed within the province, although much of these areas has been destroyed during the period 1965 to 1991 during the foreign intervention years of the Angolan Civil War. In particular, the area was previously suitable habitat for the endangered painted hunting dog, Lycaon pictus, which is now deemed extirpated in the local area.

List of governors of Cuando Cubango

References

Citations

Bibliography 
 , 9780415350150 354 pages
 C. Michael Hogan. 2009. Painted Hunting Dog: Lycaon pictus, GlobalTwitcher.com, ed. N. Stromberg

External links 
 Official website of province governor
 Information on this province at the Angolan ministry for territorial administration
 Information on this province at Info Angola
 Site Official de Kizomba
 United States government population statistics from 1988
 angola.org.uk
 Province geographical info at geoview.info

 
Provinces of Angola